Black Wolf is an unincorporated community located in McDowell County, West Virginia, United States. Black Wolf lies along the Norfolk and Western Railroad on the Tug Fork River.

References 

Unincorporated communities in McDowell County, West Virginia
Unincorporated communities in West Virginia